Saw Kill or Sawkill may refer to:

Saw Kill (Esopus Creek tributary), in New York
Saw Kill (Hudson River tributary), in New York
Sawkill, in Manhattan, New York
Sawkill Creek, in Pennsylvania